Anacampsis embrocha is a moth of the family Gelechiidae. It was described by Edward Meyrick in 1914. It is found in South Africa.

The wingspan is about 8 mm. The forewings are dark fuscous with a slender white hardly incurved slightly inwards-oblique fascia at three-fifths. The hindwings are rather dark grey.

References

Endemic moths of South Africa
Moths described in 1914
Anacampsis
Moths of Africa